Acacia robiniae, commonly known as Robin's wattle, is a shrub of the genus Acacia and the subgenus Phyllodineae that is endemic to south western Australia.

Description
Like most species of Acacia it has phyllodes rather than true leaves. The pungent, glabrous and evergreen phyllodes have an obtriangular to obdeltate to shallowly obtriangular shape that are contiguous with the branchlet. It blooms from April to September and produces white-cream flowers. The simple inflorescences occur singly in the axils and have spherical flower-heads containing two white to off-white coloured flowers. Following flowering coriaceous to crustaceous d+seed pods form that have a narrowly oblong shape and are shallowly curved.

Taxonomy
The species was first formally described by the botanist Bruce Maslin as part of the work Studies in the genus Acacia - A revision of the Uninerves - Triangulares, in part (the tetramerous species) as published in the journal Nuytsia. It was reclassified as Racosperma robiniae by Leslie Pedley in 2003 then transferred back to genus Acacia in 2006.
It belongs to the Acacia biflora group and most closely resembles Acacia divergens.

Distribution
It has a discontinuous distribution and is native to an area in the Great Southern and Goldfields-Esperance regions of Western Australia where it is commonly situated in damp areas, among granite boulders or on lateritic rises growing in sandy or loamy soils over granite or laterite. It is commonly part of Eucalyptus marginata woodlands and is found from the east of Albany to around Mount Manypeaks and another population is found around Mount Arid, much further to the east.

See also
List of Acacia species

References

robiniae
Acacias of Western Australia
Taxa named by Bruce Maslin
Plants described in 1978